Mount Minto is a mountain in the Atlin Country of far northwestern British Columbia, Canada. The local Tlingit name is K'iyán. It lies on the western side of the northeast arm of Atlin Lake. The easiest approach is via rough roads to the north from where the summit appears to be a hike.

The mountain is named for Gilbert Elliot-Murray-Kynynmound, 4th Earl of Minto, Governor-General of Canada 1898–1904.  Also named for Lord Minto was Minto City, British Columbia and the associated Minto Mine in the Bridge River Country, and a short street in Vancouver near Main & 2nd.

External links
 Canadian Mountain Encyclopedia

Minto
Atlin District